Pulsellidae is a family of molluscs belonging to the suborder Gadilimorpha in the order Gadilida. 

Genera:
 Annulipulsellum Scarabino, 1986
 Pulsellum Stoliczka, 1868
 Striopulsellum Scarabino, 1995

References

External links
 Steiner, G.; Kabat, A. R. (2001). Catalogue of supraspecific taxa of Scaphopoda (Mollusca). Zoosystema. 23(3): 433-460
 Scarabino, V. (1995). Scaphopoda of the tropical Pacific and Indian Oceans, with description of 3 new genera and 42 new species. in: Bouchet, P. (Ed.) Résultats des Campagnes MUSORSTOM 14. Mémoires du Muséum national d'Histoire naturelle. Série A, Zoologie. 167: 189-379

Molluscs